Alfred Morton Bridge (February 26, 1891 – December 27, 1957) was an American character actor who played mostly small roles in over 270 films between 1931 and 1954.  Bridge's persona was an unpleasant, gravel-voiced man with an untidy moustache. Sometimes credited as Alan Bridge, and frequently not credited onscreen at all, he appeared in many westerns, especially in the Hopalong Cassidy series, where he played crooked sheriffs and henchmen.

Life and career
Bridge and his sister, who became actress Loie Bridge, were raised by their mother and stepfather, a Philadelphia butcher.  Bridge went into vaudeville with relatives when he was still a teenager Bridge served in the American infantry during World War I.  Rejoining relatives in a theatrical troupe, Bridge toured the U.S. as an actor and wrote a few scripts.  He broke into movies with a pair of minor screenplays (the comedy short Her Hired Husband in 1930 and a Western, God's Country and the Man  (1931), in which he also appeared. He spent the next 25 years as a familiar face in B-Westerns and mainstream comedies and dramas.  In the forties, Bridge was part of Preston Sturges' unofficial "stock company" of character actors, appearing in ten of the eleven American films that Sturges wrote and directed. He is perhaps best remembered for his role as "The Mister", the chain-gang boss over Joel McCrea in Preston Sturges' Sullivan's Travels. Bridge played against type as a kindly lawyer in Sturges' The Miracle of Morgan's Creek.

Bridge's television work, which began in 1950 includes appearances on The Range Rider and The Gene Autry Show as well as other programs.

Death
Bridge died in Los Angeles two months before his 67th birthday. His remains are interred at Valhalla Memorial Park Cemetery in North Hollywood.

Selected filmography

 God's Country and the Man (1931) - Livermore
 Rider of the Plains (1931) - Deputy Bill Gaines
 The Ridin' Fool (1931) - Nikkos
 Partners of the Trail (1931) - Henchman (uncredited)
 Galloping Thru (1931) - Sandy Thompson
 South of Santa Fe (1932) - Henchman Bully
 Police Court (1932)
 Spirit of the West (1932) - Tom Fallon
 Unholy Love (1932) - Police Sergeant (uncredited)
 A Man's Land (1932) - Steve - Rustler
 Million Dollar Legs (1932) - Secret Emissary #3 (uncredited)
 The Hurricane Express (1932, Serial) - Carlson
 The Thirteenth Guest (1932) - Policeman (uncredited)
 Broadway to Cheyenne (1932) - Al
 Blonde Venus (1932) - Bouncer (uncredited)
 Cowboy Counsellor (1932) - Sheriff Matt Farraday
 Slightly Married (1932) - Tenant (uncredited)
 The Devil Horse (1932) - Curley Bates - Henchman
 The Wyoming Whirlwind (1932) - Steve Cantrell
 When a Man Rides Alone (1933) - Montana Slade
 The Cheyenne Kid (1933) - Denver Ed
 Drum Taps (1933) - Lariat Smith
 The Thundering Herd (1933) - Catlee - Pruitt's Henchman
 Sucker Money (1933) - George Hunter
 Black Beauty (1933) - Hack Driver
 Son of the Border (1933) - Tupper
 The Lone Avenger (1933) - Burl Adams
 Sunset Pass (1933) - Tom
 Fighting Texans (1933) - Gus Durkin
 Fighting with Kit Carson (1933, Serial) - Henchman Reynolds [Chs. 1–7, 10, 12]
 The Trail Drive (1933) - Henchman Bucko (uncredited)
 Murder on the Campus (1933) - Grimes, City Editor (uncredited)
 Twin Husbands (1933) - Highway Patrolman (uncredited)
 Public Stenographer (1934) - Detective Scott (uncredited)
 Good Dame (1934) - Patrol Car Cop (uncredited)
 Looking for Trouble (1934) - Lineman (uncredited)
 The Trumpet Blows (1934) - Policeman (uncredited)
 Honor of the Range (1934) - Townsman (uncredited)
 We're Not Dressing (1934) - Ship's Officer - Rescue Party (uncredited)
 Burn 'Em Up Barnes (1934, Serial) - Henchman Tucker [Chs. 3-12] (uncredited)
 The Curtain Falls (1934) - Mover (uncredited)
 Mystery Mountain (1934) - Tom Henderson
 North of Arizona (1935) - George Tully
 Outlaw Rule (1935) - Deputy Bat Lindstrom
 Transient Lady (1935) - Sheriff Angel Verner
 Circumstantial Evidence (1935) - John Cassidy (uncredited)
 Alias Mary Dow (1935) - Ditch-Digger (uncredited)
 Silent Valley (1935) - Jim Farley
 The Headline Woman (1935) - Baker, Editor (uncredited)
 The Murder Man (1935) - Judge John C. Garfield (uncredited)
 The Adventures of Rex and Rinty (1935, Serial) - Henchman Mitchell [Chs. 1–6, 10]
 Diamond Jim (1935) - Poker Player on Train (uncredited)
 The Gay Deception (1935) - Jail Attendant (uncredited)
 Confidential (1935) - Hanover - Walsh's Henchman
 Valley of Wanted Men (1935) - Ranger Sergeant Parsons
 Melody Trail (1935) - Matt Kirby
 Rendezvous (1935) - Sergeant (uncredited)
 The New Frontier (1935) - Kit
 A Night at the Opera (1935) - Immigration Inspector (uncredited)
 Gallant Defender (1935) - Salty Smith
 The Adventures of Frank Merriwell (1936, Serial) - Henchman Black
 The Bridge of Sighs (1936) - Ballistics Expert (uncredited)
 The Lawless Nineties (1936) - Steele
 Fast Bullets (1936) - Travis
 The Music Goes 'Round (1936) - Police Inspector (uncredited)
 Call of the Prairie (1936) - Sam Porter
 These Three (1936) - Mrs. Walton's Chauffeur (uncredited)
 And So They Were Married (1936) - Motorcycle Cop (uncredited)
 Public Enemy's Wife (1936) - Swartzman
 Mary of Scotland (1936) - (uncredited)
 Crash Donovan (1936) - Desk Sergeant (uncredited)
 They Met in a Taxi (1936) - Detective (uncredited)
 The Three Mesquiteers (1936) - Olin Canfield
 Ace Drummond (1936, Serial) - Paul Wyckoff
 Trail Dust (1936) - Tom Babson
 Dodge City Trail (1936) - Dawson
 Jungle Jim (1937, Serial) - Slade
 Westbound Mail (1937) - 'Bull' Feeney
 You Only Live Once (1937) - Guard (uncredited)
 Borderland (1937) - Dandy Morgan - Henchman
 Song of the City (1937) - Captain (uncredited)
 Two Gun Law (1937) - Kipp Faulkner
 Woman Chases Man (1937) - Process Server (uncredited)
 Married Before Breakfast (1937) - Police Driver (uncredited)
 One Man Justice (1937) - Red Grindy
 Wild West Days (1937) - Steve Claggett
 They Won't Forget (1937) - Mob Leader Outside Governor's Mansion (uncredited)
 Dead End (1937) - Policeman in Drina's Apartment (uncredited)
 Western Gold (1937) - Holman
 The Awful Truth (1937) - Motor Cop (uncredited)
 Springtime in the Rockies (1937) - Briggs
 Tim Tyler's Luck (1937, Serial) - Capt. Trowbridge [Ch. 1] (uncredited)
 Partners of the Plains (1938) - Scar Lewis
 Little Miss Roughneck (1938) - Sheriff
 Born to Be Wild (1938) - Kennedy - Trucker in Cafe (uncredited)
 Jezebel (1938) - New Orleans Sheriff (uncredited)
 Two Gun Justice (1938) - Sheriff
 Crime School (1938) - Mr. Burke
 Gunsmoke Trail (1938) - Sheriff chasing Loma
 Reformatory (1938) - Guard (uncredited)
 Highway Patrol (1938) - Jarvis
 The Great Adventures of Wild Bill Hickok (1938) - Blackie (uncredited)
 Flaming Frontiers (1938, Serial) - John Merkle [Chs. 6-7] (uncredited)
 Marie Antoinette (1938) - Official in Passport Office (uncredited)
 The Colorado Trail (1938) - Mark Sheldon
 Down in 'Arkansaw' (1938) - Jake
 Adventure in Sahara (1938) - Cpl. Dronov
 Call of the Rockies (1938) - Weston
 The Phantom Creeps (1939) - White Rose Sailor (uncredited)
 Devil's Island (1939) - Captain of the Guards (uncredited)
 Frontiers of '49 (1939) - Army Sergeant (uncredited)
 Risky Business (1939) - Cop (uncredited)
 The Oklahoma Kid (1939) - Would-Be Settler (uncredited)
 Romance of the Redwoods (1939) - Boss Whittaker
 Buck Rogers (1939, Serial) - Dynamo Room Floor Guard (uncredited)
 Blue Montana Skies (1939) - Marshal
 The Man from Sundown (1939) - Slick Larson
 Thunder Afloat (1939) - Fisherman (uncredited)
 No Place to Go (1939) - Frank Crowley
 Oklahoma Frontier (1939) - Kentuck (uncredited)
 Mr. Smith Goes to Washington (1939) - Senator Dwight (uncredited)
 The Roaring Twenties (1939) - Ship Captain (uncredited)
 The Stranger from Texas (1939) - Jeff Browning
 My Son Is Guilty (1939) - Police Lieutenant at Holdup (uncredited)
 West of Carson City (1940) - Foreman of the Jury (uncredited)
 My Little Chickadee (1940) - Barfly Drinking Straight Whiskey (uncredited)
 Pioneers of the Frontier (1940) - Marshal Larsen
 The Courageous Dr. Christian (1940) - Sheriff
 Blazing Six Shooters (1940) - Bert Karsin
 Dark Command (1940) - Slave Trader (uncredited)
 If I Had My Way (1940) - Doorman (uncredited)
 Passport to Alcatraz (1940) - James Carver (uncredited)
 Winners of the West (1940, Serial) - Captain [Ch. 13] (uncredited)
 When the Daltons Rode (1940) - Townsman (uncredited)
 Flowing Gold (1940) - Highway Patrolman (uncredited)
 Diamond Frontier (1940) - Guard (uncredited)
 Barnyard Follies (1940) - Policeman (uncredited)
 Christmas in July (1940) - Mr. Hillbeiner
 Santa Fe Trail (1940) - Palmyra Townsman (uncredited)
 The Green Hornet Strikes Again! (1940, Serial) - Ship's Captain (uncredited)
 The Lone Rider Rides On (1941) - Bob Cameron
 The Face Behind the Mask (1941) - Flop House Manager (uncredited)
 The Kid's Last Ride (1941) - Bob Harmon, aka Jim Breeden
 The Lady Eve (1941) - First Steward (uncredited)
 Double Date (1941) - Sergeant O'Rourke (uncredited)
 The Lady from Cheyenne (1941) - Mr. Matthews
 The Lone Rider Rides On (1941) - Bob Cameron
 Road to Zanzibar (1941) - Colonial Policeman with Inspector (uncredited)
 Lady from Louisiana (1941) - Captain of Police (uncredited)
 The Big Boss (1941) - Minor Role (uncredited)
 Country Fair (1941) - (uncredited)
 Law of the Range (1941) - Jamison
 Rawhide Rangers (1941) - Rawlings
 Wild Geese Calling (1941) - Minor Role (uncredited)
 The Little Foxes (1941) - Dawson (uncredited)
 Badlands of Dakota (1941) - Plainview Lawman (uncredited)
 Honky Tonk (1941) - Townsman at Meeting House (uncredited)
 Tuxedo Junction (1941) - Chief Conway (uncredited)
 Sullivan's Travels (1941) - The Mister
 Fighting Bill Fargo (1941) - Tom Houston
 Honolulu Lu (1941) - Shooting Gallery Proprietor (uncredited)
 Road Agent (1941) - Rancher (uncredited)
 Sealed Lips (1942) - Newspaper Morgue Attendant (uncredited)
 West of Tombstone (1942) - U. S. Marshal (uncredited)
 Pardon My Stripes (1942) - Guard (uncredited)
 Wild Bill Hickok Rides (1942) - Man (uncredited)
 The Man Who Returned to Life (1942) - Hobo (uncredited)
 The Mad Doctor of Market Street (1942) - Ship's Officer on Bridge (uncredited)
 Reap the Wild Wind (1942) - Cutler Man in Barrel Room (uncredited)
 The Affairs of Jimmy Valentine (1942) - Trustee
 Saboteur (1942) - Marine MP Sergeant (uncredited)
 In This Our Life (1942) - Worker (uncredited)
 Meet the Stewarts (1942) - Police Turnkey (uncredited)
 Juke Girl (1942) - Farmer Hiring Bean Pickers (uncredited)
 Lady in a Jam (1942) - Furniture Mover (uncredited)
 Men of Texas (1942) - Goodrich (uncredited)
 Bad Men of the Hills (1942) - Sheriff Mace Arnold
 The Talk of the Town (1942) - Desk Sergeant (uncredited)
 The Palm Beach Story (1942) - Conductor
 Bells of Capistrano (1942) - Westfall Saloon Bartender (uncredited)
 A Man's World (1942) - Capt. Peterson (uncredited)
 I Married a Witch (1942) - Second Prison Guard (uncredited)
 The Traitor Within (1942) - Henchman (uncredited)
 Tenting Tonight on the Old Camp Ground (1943) - Matt Warner
 Idaho (1943) - Jailer (uncredited)
 The Man from Thunder River (1943) - Prospector (uncredited)
 Petticoat Larceny (1943) - Jack Goss (uncredited)
 Nobody's Darling (1943) - Bum (uncredited)
 The Miracle of Morgan's Creek (1943) - Mr. Johnson
 And the Angels Sing (1944) - Squad Car Policeman (uncredited)
 The Great Moment (1944) - Mr. Stone (uncredited)
 Hail the Conquering Hero (1944) - Political Boss
 Cry of the Werewolf (1944) - Coroner at Inquest (uncredited)
 The Merry Monahans (1944) - Man on Train (uncredited)
 The Unwritten Code (1944) - Sheriff (uncredited)
 The Missing Juror (1944) - Deputy Sheriff Ben (uncredited)
 The Princess and the Pirate (1944) - Pirate (uncredited)
 The Jade Mask (1945) - Sheriff Mack
 A Tree Grows in Brooklyn (1945) - Cheap Charlie (uncredited)
 A Guy, a Gal and a Pal (1945) - Mayor (uncredited)
 Thunderhead, Son of Flicka (1945) - Dr. Hicks (uncredited)
 Salty O'Rourke (1945) - Bartender (uncredited)
 The Clock (1945) - Second Subway Official (uncredited)
 Escape in the Desert (1945) - Citizen Gunman (uncredited)
 The Unseen (1945) - Truck Driver (uncredited)
 Both Barrels Blazing (1945) - Lucky Thorpe (uncredited)
 Blazing the Western Trail (1945) - Forrest Brent (uncredited)
 Saratoga Trunk (1945) - Soule Gang Engineer (uncredited)
 She Wouldn't Say Yes (1945) - Conductor (uncredited)
 Road to Utopia (1945) - Ship Captain (uncredited)
 They Were Expendable (1945) - Lieutenant Colonel (uncredited)
 Miss Susie Slagle's (1946) - Cab Driver (uncredited)
 Deadline at Dawn (1946) - Detective Smiley (uncredited)
 The Falcon's Alibi (1946) - Police Inspector Blake
 Shadows Over Chinatown (1946) - Capt. Allen
 My Pal Trigger (1946) - Henry Wallace (uncredited)
 Cowboy Blues (1946) - Jim Peters (uncredited)
 Below the Deadline (1946) - Turner
 Two Years Before the Mast (1946) - Publisher (uncredited)
 Cross My Heart (1946) - Det. Flynn
 It's a Wonderful Life (1946) - Sheriff with arrest warrant (uncredited)
 Alias Mr. Twilight (1946) - Sam Bartlett
 Singin' in the Corn (1946) - Honest John Richards
 The Mighty McGurk (1947) - Toothless Derelict (uncredited)
 California (1947) - Town Marshal (uncredited)
 Nora Prentiss (1947) - NYC Policeman (uncredited)
 The Sin of Harold Diddlebock (1947) - Wild Bill Hickok
 The Michigan Kid (1947) - Sheriff (uncredited)
 Dick Tracy's Dilemma (1947) - Mr. Cudd (uncredited)
 Framed (1947) - Judge (uncredited)
 Robin Hood of Texas (1947) - Sheriff
 Down to Earth (1947) - Police Captain (uncredited)
 Song of the Thin Man (1947) - Nagle - Waterfront Policeman (uncredited)
 The Hal Roach Comedy Carnival (1947) - Bartender, in 'Fabulous Joe'
 The Fabulous Joe (1947) - Florida Club Bartender
 Black Gold (1947) - Dr. Jonas, Veterinarian (uncredited)
 Unconquered (1947) - Militiaman at Fair (uncredited)
 Messenger of Peace (1947) - Harry Franzmeirer
 T-Men (1947) - Agent in Phone Booth (uncredited)
 Road to Rio (1947) - Ship's Officer (uncredited)
 Smart Woman (1948) - Hotel Clerk (uncredited)
 Fury at Furnace Creek (1948) - Lawyer (uncredited)
 Silver River (1948) - Sam Slade
 Unfaithfully Yours (1948) - House Detective
 Quick on the Trigger (1948) - Judge Kormac
 That Wonderful Urge (1948) - Conovan (uncredited)
 The Paleface (1948) - Governor's Horseman (uncredited)
 South of St. Louis (1949) - Farmer (uncredited)
 The Beautiful Blonde from Bashful Bend (1949) - Sheriff Ambrose
 The Doolins of Oklahoma (1949) - Deputy Sheriff (uncredited)
 Trail of the Yukon (1949) - The Drunk (uncredited)
 The Devil's Henchman (1949) - Elmer Hood
 Roseanna McCoy (1949) - Medicine Seller (uncredited)
 The Traveling Saleswoman (1950) - P. Carter (uncredited)
 A Woman of Distinction (1950) - Editor (uncredited)
 North of the Great Divide (1950) - Henry Gates (uncredited)
 The Tougher They Come (1950) - Jensen
 California Passage (1950) - Conover
 Hunt the Man Down (1950) - Ulysses Grant Sheldon (uncredited)
 Oh! Susanna (1951) - Jake Ledbetter
 In Old Amarillo (1951) - Sheriff (uncredited)
 Strangers on a Train (1951) - Tennis Judge (uncredited)
 Utah Wagon Train (1951) - Sam Sickle
 All That I Have (1951) - John Biddle, Gardener
 The Last Musketeer (1952) - Lem Shaver
 We're Not Married! (1952) - Det. Magnus (uncredited)
 Barbed Wire (1952) - McGraw (uncredited)
 Iron Mountain Trail (1953) - The Marshal
 Jubilee Trail (1954) - Mr. Turner (uncredited)
 Hell's Outpost (1954) - Banker (uncredited) (final film role)

References

External links

 
 
 
 

1891 births
1957 deaths
Male actors from Pennsylvania
American male film actors
Burials at Valhalla Memorial Park Cemetery
20th-century American male actors
Male Western (genre) film actors
Western (genre) television actors